Joseph Henry Barnes was an American Brevet Brigadier General who commanded the 29th Massachusetts Infantry Regiment during the Eastern Theater of the American Civil War.

Biography

Early life
Joseph was born on July 25, 1833. He moved to East Boston some time later and became a printer before the outbreak of the American Civil War. He also married Anna Delia Stickney and later had 3 children.

American Civil War
Barnes raised a militia consisting of East Bostonians known as the "Greenough Guards" by Governor John Albion Andrew himself before being commissioned for Federal Service in May 18, 1861 and made a captain of Company C of the 1st Massachusetts Infantry Regiment on May 22 and shortly after, participated at the First Battle of Bull Run. Barnes was then made Lieutenant Colonel of the newly formed 29th Massachusetts Infantry Regiment on December 13, 1861 as he led Company K of the regiment.

Barnes then became the main commander of the regiment after Colonel Ebenezer W. Peirce was considered absent but was wounded at the Battle of White Oak Swamp and was recovering but managed to participate at the Battle of Antietam as the regiment was part of the Irish Brigade during the assault on the Sunken Road. After the two battles, the 29th Massachusetts became a part of the IX Corps and continued to command in the Siege of Petersburg such as in the Battle of the Crater before he was honorably mustered out on October 9, 1864. He was brevetted to Brigadier General on August 19, 1864 for his services at the Battle of Globe Tavern.

Later years
After the war, Barnes would serve as the Deputy Collector of the Port of Boston from 1880 to 1900. He was also associated with veteran associations as well as a member of the Military Order of the Loyal Legion of the United States and the Grand Army of the Republic.

See also
List of American Civil War brevet generals (Union)

References

1833 births
1906 deaths
People of Massachusetts in the American Civil War
Union Army colonels
Union Army generals
People from Hingham, Massachusetts
Military personnel from Massachusetts